The 1898 Penn Quakers football team represented the University of Pennsylvania in the 1898 college football season.

Schedule

References

Penn
Penn Quakers football seasons
College football undefeated seasons
Penn Quakers football